The men's decathlon at the 2018 IAAF World U20 Championships was held at Ratina Stadium on 10 and 11 July.

Records

Results

References

decathlon
Combined events at the World Athletics U20 Championships